Marína Karélla  (born 17 July 1940) is a Greek artist and the wife of Prince Michael of Greece and Denmark.

Life
Marína Karélla was born in Athens on 17 July 1940 to industrialist Theódoros Karéllas and Élli Chalikiopoúlou.

In 1960, Karélla was enrolled at the Athens School of Fine Arts, where she studied till 1963. She then continued with her studies at the École des Beaux-Arts in Paris and the Academy of Fine Arts in Salzburg, having also trained under notable artists like Oskar Kokoška and Giánnis Tsaroúchis.

On 7 February 1965, she married Prince Michael of Greece and Denmark at the Royal Palace in Athens. However, because the marriage was considered non-dynastic, she did not automatically acquire the title of 'Princess of Greece and Denmark' nor the style of 'Her Royal Highness', but is instead referred to as Marína, Consort of Prince Michael of Greece and Denmark.

The couple has two daughters: Princess Alexándra (born 15 October 1968 in Athens) and Princess Ólga of Greece (born 17 November 1971 in Athens).

Work
Karélla began her career in 1966, when she presented her first exhibition of paintings at the Festival of Two Worlds in Italy. Her early career was heavily inspired by themes related to Greece. In the '70s she exhibited her White Paintings at Gallery Ioulas, which are now considered among the most famous pieces of her work. The following decade, Karella put up multiple exhibitions at the Earl McGrath Gallery in New York, which also included collaborations with Jack Pierson. Throughout the '90s her work was featured in multiple publications, including The New Yorker and New York (magazine).

During her career Karélla has put up a number of exhibitions in various cities around the world, such as New York, Los Angeles, Athens, Brussels, Rome, and London, while many of her works are also hosted in many museums and institutions. In 2005, a retrospective exhibition of her work was organized at the Benaki Museum in Athens.

In more recent years, Karélla has increasingly ventured into philanthropic works and is currently the founder and president of Eliza, a non-profit society that works towards the prevention of cruelty against children.

References

Further reading
 
 
 
 

1940 births
Living people
20th-century Greek women artists
21st-century Greek women artists
Greek painters
Morganatic spouses
Marina
Greek sculptors
20th-century Greek sculptors
Artists from Athens
Greek women painters